The 1797 Sumatra earthquake occurred at 22:00 local time on February 10. It was the first in a series of great earthquakes that ruptured part of the Sumatran segment of the Sunda megathrust. It caused a damaging tsunami that was particularly severe near Padang, where a 150–200 ton English ship was driven 1 km inland up the Arau River.

Background
The island of Sumatra lies on the convergent plate boundary between the Indo-Australian Plate and the Eurasian Plate. The convergence between these plates is highly oblique near Sumatra, with the displacement being accommodated by near pure dip-slip faulting along the subduction zone, known as the Sunda megathrust, and near pure strike-slip faulting along the Great Sumatran fault. The major slip events on the subduction zone interface are typically of the megathrust type.
 
Historically, great or giant megathrust earthquakes have been recorded in 1797, 1833, 1861, 2004, 2005 and 2007, most of them being associated with devastating tsunamis. Smaller (but still large) megathrust events have also occurred in the small gaps between the areas that slip during these larger events, in 1935, 1984, 2000 and 2002.

Damage
The earthquake caused the collapse or damage of many houses. The tsunami surge drove an English sailing ship of 150–200 tons, moored in the Arau River, about 1 km inland, destroying several houses as it went. Smaller boats were driven up to 1.8 km upstream. In Air Manis, the whole town was flooded and the bodies of several people who had climbed trees to escape the surge were found the next day in the branches. Only two fatalities were reported from Padang itself but many more from Air Manis. The Batu Islands were also reported to be affected.

Characteristics

Earthquake
The shaking at Padang lasted one minute. Reports in 1845 and 1847 said either that this was the strongest earthquake in the memory of the residents of Padang or the strongest for forty years.

Tsunami
The run-up of the tsunami at Padang and the village of Air Manis is estimated to be in the range of 5–10 m. Modelling of tsunami effects using source parameters estimated from the uplift of coral microatolls, provide a reasonable match to the sparse historical records.

The tsunami reports for this event are localised around Padang and it has been suggested that the tsunami may have been caused by an underwater landslide triggered by the earthquake.

See also
 List of earthquakes in Indonesia
 List of historical earthquakes
 List of historical tsunamis

References

Megathrust earthquakes in Sumatra
Sumatra
1797 in Asia
1797 in Indonesia
1797 tsunamis
Tsunamis in Indonesia